Eristena szechuanalis is a moth in the family Crambidae. It was described by Aristide Caradja in 1934. It is found in Sichuan, China.

References

Acentropinae
Moths described in 1934